Saint Engelmund (Engelmond, Ingelmund) of Velsen (died 14 May c. 739) was an English-born missionary to Frisia.  He was educated in his native country and entered the Benedictine Order.  He was ordained a priest and later became an abbot.

Life
Although born in England, he had lived in Friesland with his parents and so knew the language. He traveled to Frisia to join Saint Willibrord in evangelizing the region. Engelmund was based at Velsen near Haarlem, where he later died at an advanced age, of fever.

Iconography
Saint Engelmund is depicted as a pilgrim abbot with a fountain springing under his staff.

References

External links
Saints of June 21: Engelmund of Velsen
Detailed consideration of the legend and relics of Engelmund, in Dutch

Dutch Roman Catholic saints
739 deaths
Dutch Benedictines
People from Velsen
8th-century Christian saints
Anglo-Saxon Benedictines
Year of birth unknown